The Horace J. and Ann S. Shinn Cottage, in Cottage Grove, Oregon, is listed on the National Register of Historic Places.  It was built in 1904, and is located at 1308 Ash Avenue.

See also
 National Register of Historic Places listings in Lane County, Oregon

References

1904 establishments in Oregon
Buildings and structures in Cottage Grove, Oregon
Houses completed in 1904
Houses in Lane County, Oregon
Houses on the National Register of Historic Places in Oregon
National Register of Historic Places in Lane County, Oregon